Neurobiology of Stress is a peer-reviewed open-access scientific journal covering research on the neurobiology of stress. It was established in 2015 and is published by Elsevier. The editor-in-chief is R. Valentino (National Institute on Drug Abuse). The journal is abstracted and indexed in the Emerging Sources Citation Index and in the past, Scopus.

References

External links

Creative Commons Attribution-licensed journals
Publications established in 2015
English-language journals
Neuroscience journals
Biannual journals
Elsevier academic journals